The Sunehri Masjid is an 18th-century mosque in Old Delhi. It was built by Mughal noble Roshan-ud-Daula, during the reign of Mughal Emperor Muhammad Shah. It is located near the Gurudwara Sis Ganj Sahib in Chandni Chowk, once an imperial boulevard leading to the Red Fort.

The mosque's original appearance has been altered as extensions to accommodate the faithful have been constructed. The mosque is also under threat from encroachment.

History 
The Sunehri Masjid was built in the period 1721-1722 by Roshan-ud-Daula, a Mughal amir who was beginning to rise to power in the court of the Mughal Emperor Muhammad Shah. The mosque was dedicated to Roshan-ud-Daula's spiritual mentor, Shah Bhik.

In 1739, the Persian Nadir Shah invaded Delhi. Standing in the Sunehri Masjid, he ordered the plunder of Delhi, which resulted in an immense loss of life and damage to the city.

Architecture 
Elevated above street level on a plinth, the Sunehri Masjid is reached by a flight of stairs. The mosque is topped by three bulbous, gilted domes, and features slender minarets. The facade of the mosque bears three arched entryways. The interior of the mosque is divided into three bays. Stucco decoration work appears in both the interior and exterior of the mosque, in the form of arabesques and floral motifs.

References

External links 

Mosques in Delhi
Mughal mosques
Religious buildings and structures completed in 1722
1722 establishments in India